Christopher Swift Dickey (August 31, 1951 – July 16, 2020) was an American journalist, author, and news editor. He was the Paris-based world news editor for The Daily Beast. He authored seven books, including Our Man in Charleston: Britain's Secret Agent in the Civil War South (2015); Securing the City: Inside America's Best Counterterror Force – the NYPD (2009), and a memoir, Summer of Deliverance (1998), about his father, the poet/novelist James Dickey.

Early years
Christopher Dickey was born on August 31, 1951, in Nashville, Tennessee, to Maxine (Syerson) Dickey and American poet/novelist James Dickey. During his early years, his family moved to Atlanta, France, Italy, Oregon, and Virginia. In 1972, Dickey received his bachelor of arts degree from the University of Virginia. In 1974, he received his master's degree in documentary filmmaking from Boston University.

Career
Dickey's career as a foreign correspondent began as Mexico and Central America Bureau Chief for The Washington Post in 1980 after he had spent six years in various editing and writing positions at the paper. Over the following three decades for The Washington Post and then for Newsweek magazine he covered wars in Central America and the Middle East, with occasional forays into Africa and the Balkans. From his experiences in the field he produced the non-fiction books of reportage, With the Contras: A Reporter in the Wilds of Nicaragua (1986) and Expats: Travels in Arabia from Tripoli to Tehran (1990); and two novels: Innocent Blood (1997), and its sequel, The Sleeper (2004). New York Times Book Review selected With the Contras, Summer of Deliverance, and Securing the City as notable books of the year in 1986, 1998, and 2009, respectively.

From 2010 to 2013, after Newsweek was acquired by IAC, Dickey worked for both Newsweek and The Daily Beast as Paris bureau chief and Middle East editor, but stayed with The Daily Beast when Newsweek was sold a third time. In March 2014, he was named world news editor for The Daily Beast.

In 1983–84, Dickey was an Edward R. Murrow Fellow at the Council on Foreign Relations. Original articles and essays by Dickey have appeared in Foreign Affairs, Foreign Policy, The New York Times Book Review, The New York Review of Books, Vanity Fair, Departures, and many other publications.

Robert De Niro's Tribeca Productions optioned Securing the City in the fall of 2009, to develop into a television series. The Christopher Dickey Award is named after him.

Personal life

Dickey married Susan Tuckerman in 1969. The couple had one son, James Bayard Tuckerman Dickey. The couple divorced in 1979. In 1980, Dickey married his second wife, Carol Salvatore.

Death

Christopher Dickey died of heart failure in Paris on July 16, 2020, aged 68.

Works

Nonfiction
 With the Contras: A Reporter in the Wilds of Nicaragua (1986)
 Expats: Travels in Arabia, from Tripoli to Teheran (1990)
 Securing the City: Inside America's Best Counter-Terror Force - the NYPD (2009)
 Our Man in Charleston: Britain's Secret Agent in the Civil War South (2015)

Fiction
 Innocent Blood (1997)
 The Sleeper (2004)

Memoir
 Summer of Deliverance (1998)

References

External links

The Shadowland Journal, Dickey's blog

1951 births
2020 deaths
American magazine editors
American male journalists
American male non-fiction writers
Writers from Nashville, Tennessee
Brown University alumni
University of Virginia alumni
The Washington Post journalists